25E-NBOH (2C-E-NBOH, NBOH-2C-E) is a derivative of the phenethylamine derived hallucinogen 2C-E. It was first developed by Martin Hansen at the University of Copenhagen in 2010 as a brain imaging agent, but has subsequently been sold as a designer drug, first being identified in Brazil in 2018 on seized blotter paper, as well as in Slovenia. It acts as a potent serotonin receptor agonist with similar affinity to better-known compounds such as 25I-NBOMe at 5-HT2A and 5-HT2C receptors.

Legal status

United Kingdom

See also
 4-EA-NBOMe
 DOET
 2C-TFE
 2C-E-FLY

References 

25-NB (psychedelics)
Designer drugs
Phenols
Phenethylamines